Lightle House may refer to:

Ben Lightle House (301 East Market Avenue, Searcy, Arkansas) listed on the National Register of Historic Places (NRHP) in White County, Arkansas
Lightle House (107 North Elm Street, Searcy, Arkansas), NRHP-listed in White County, Arkansas
Lightle House (605 Race Avenue, Searcy, Arkansas), NRHP-listed in White County, Arkansas
Lightle House (County Road 76, Searcy, Arkansas), NRHP-listed in White County, Arkansas
William H. Lightle House (601 East Race Street, Searcy, Arkansas), NRHP-listed in White County, Arkansas
National Register of Historic Places listings in White County, Arkansas, NRHP-listed in White County, Arkansas